Ryan Thomas Porteous (born 25 March 1999) is a Scottish professional footballer who plays for English Championship club Watford and the Scotland national team. He has previously played for Hibernian and spent a spell on loan at Edinburgh City, and represented Scotland at the under-19, under-20 and under-21 levels before making his full international debut in September 2022.

Club career

Hibernian
Raised in Dalkeith in Midlothian, Porteous supported Hibernian in childhood and attended Dalkeith High School. He played youth football for Edinburgh club Edina Hibs and then Aberdeen before returning to Edinburgh to sign for his boyhood club. After establishing himself in the Hibernian youth system, he was loaned to Edinburgh City for the 2016–17 season and scored goals that secured wins against Annan Athletic (Edinburgh City's first in the SPFL) and Arbroath.

He made his first team debut for Hibernian in a 2017–18 Scottish League Cup group stage match against Montrose. He then scored two goals in his second appearance for Hibs, a 6–1 win against Arbroath in the same competition. Although becoming a regular in the senior squad during that season (30 times an unused substitute in addition to six Scottish Premiership matches in which he did feature), Porteous also continued to appear for the club's Under-20s, whose campaign ended with a 'double' of SPFL Development League and Scottish Youth Cup.

During October 2018, Porteous signed a new contract with Hibernian, due to run until the summer of 2023. He suffered a knee injury in January 2019 that required surgery, which prevented him from playing for the rest of the 2018–19 season.

On 20 December 2019, Porteous was shown a straight red card for a dangerous tackle on Rangers player Borna Barišić, with the incident provoking an angry confrontation between both coaching teams. Porteous suffered a serious knee injury during a Scottish Cup match at Dundee United in January 2020.

He returned from the injury ahead of the 2020–21 season, in which Hibs finished in third place and reached the 2021 Scottish Cup Final. Hibs turned down a bid of around £1 million from Millwall for Porteous in January 2021. 

His 2021–22 season was disrupted by suspensions, as he was sent off twice and also banned retrospectively once. In the same week as his widely praised debut for the Scotland national team, Porteous scored his first goal of the 2022–23 season with the opener in a 2–0 victory at Ross County on 1 October 2022. Hibs announced in November that Porteous had turned down their offer of a new contract. 

In January 2023, Porteous was subject of interest from Serie A side Udinese and EFL Championship side Blackburn Rovers. Hibs accepted an offer from Watford, another Championship club, of around £450,000.

Watford
On 27 January 2023, Porteous signed a contract with Watford that is due to run until the end of the 2026–27 season. He scored a goal during his first appearance for Watford, a 2–2 draw at Reading on 4 February.

International career
Porteous was named in the Scotland under-19 squad for the elite round of qualification for the 2017 UEFA European Under-19 Championship. 

Selected for the Scotland under-21 squad in the 2018 Toulon Tournament, the team lost to Turkey in a penalty-out and finished fourth. After he made his debut at the tournament, he made 14 appearances in total over the following two years.

He earned a first senior Scotland call-up for Euro 2020 qualifiers against Cyprus and Kazakhstan in November 2019, but did not play in either fixture. He was added to squads in October 2020 and November 2021.

Porteous was recalled to the squad in September 2022 and, following injuries to Kieran Tierney and Scott McKenna, made his full international debut in a Nations League match with Ukraine. The team produced a solid defensive performance to record a goalless draw that secured first place in the group, thereby sealing promotion to the top level of the Nations League and a guaranteed play-off appearance in qualifying for UEFA Euro 2024. Porteous was singled out for praise by his teammates, manager and members of the media, with boss Steve Clarke describing his performance as "outstanding" and pundit Michael Stewart hailing a "debut to remember". Captain John McGinn, a former teammate at Hibernian, said "(Porteous) was first class. A 10-out-of-10 performance. If he keeps on performing like that there's no doubt he can be a Scotland regular for years to come."

Personal life
His older sister Emma is also a footballer who played for Hibernian and was selected for Scotland at youth level before taking a university scholarship in Pennsylvania to combine her sporting and academic studies. Ryan missed her graduation to play for Scotland Under-21s.

As of 2018, Porteous was signed to an agency operated by tennis player Andy Murray.

In October 2020, Porteous declared his support for the Common Goal charity.

Porteous was fined by both a court and Hibernian in June 2022, after he pled guilty to a charge of culpable and reckless conduct for hitting a woman with a plastic tumbler.

Career statistics

Notes

References

External links

1999 births
Living people
Scottish footballers
Association football central defenders
Aberdeen F.C. players
Hibernian F.C. players
F.C. Edinburgh players
Scottish Professional Football League players
Footballers from Edinburgh
People from Dalkeith
People educated at Dalkeith High School
Scotland youth international footballers
Scotland under-21 international footballers
Sportspeople from Midlothian
Scotland international footballers
Watford F.C. players
English Football League players